The privatization of transport refers to the process of shifting responsibility regarding the provision of public transport or service from the public to the private sector.

Introduction

Transit privatization is highly controversial, with proponents claiming great potential benefits and detractors pointing to cases where privatization has been highly problematic.

One important argument in this respect is the consideration of public transport as a merit good. The rationale behind it is the idea that governments should guarantee basic service in public transport to deprived customer groups despite the fact that it is economically irrational.

While the subsidization of public transport is basically not contested, the important question in the public vs. private debate refers to the optimal level of subsidy. Today there are no real answers to this issue, but Japanese policy to have a relatively free transportation market is considered to function well in providing transport to Japan's three major metropolitan areas. The country's flagship high-speed line, the Tokaido Shinkansen, has operated for almost half a century without a single derailment or collision, and in 2007, its average departure delay was a mere 18 seconds along its 320-mile route.

Impact

Price

The 1970s were an era of deregulation within the U.S. Back then public transport (i.e. railroads in 1976 and airlines in 1978) were deregulated.  Ticket prices increase or decrease based on the service provided and the amount of public subsidies.

Different approaches to privatize railways in U.S. and Europe were taken. In Europe, rail operations were separated from rail infrastructure, while the U.S. railroad system is widely deregulated and vertically integrated.

Another example were public owned bus companies in the U.K. Those companies were reorganized in 1985 into private companies (with the exception of London). Cost savings mainly resulted from reduced employment costs and increased productivity.

Service quality

A number of innovations were adopted by private bus companies in the pursuit of profits with the most important being the launch of minibuses that increased service levels.

However, separating rail operations from rail infrastructure turned out to make coordination of rail operations and infrastructure maintenance more difficult.

Safety

The changes to the U.K. bus industry as a result of privatization had in contrast to the changes to the U.K. railway industry no effects on its safety.

In the U.K. privatising railways entailed cost overruns, accidents and, finally, the bankruptcy of the rail infrastructure company. For the rest of Europe the separation of rail operations from rail infrastructure did not cause substantial problems.  The McNulty review of the UK railway industry in 2011 found that the fragmentation of the industry in the course of privatisation had caused a permanent increase in costs of between 20% and 30%.

By the same token, airline market reformation in Europe has been successful. Today, a single European airline market exists leading to improved productivity and decreased ticket prices. As in the U.S., low-cost carriers have affected the market and, thus, improved resource allocation.

Notes

References

International Transport Forum, (2008), Privatisation and Regulation of Urban Transit Systems, OECD Publishing.

Clifford Winston, (2010), Last Exit: Privatization and Deregulation of the U.S. Transportation System, Brookings Institution.

Black William R., (2003), Transportation: A Geographical Analysis, The Guilford Press.

Cooper James, Mundy Ray, Nelson John, (2010), Taxi!: Urban Economies and the Social and Transport Impacts of the Taxicab, Ashgate Publishing Limited.

European Conference of Ministers of Transport, (2005), 16th International Symposium on Theory and Practice in Transport Economics, OECD Publishing.

Klein Daniel B., Moore Adrian T., Reja Binyam, (1997), Curb Rights: A Foundation for Free Enterprise in Urban Transit, Brookings Institution.

See also

Rail deregulation in the U.S.
Rail deregulation in the U.K.
Bus deregulation in the U.K.
Airline deregulation

Economics of regulation
Privatization